Allan Ellis may refer to:
Allan Ellis (American football) (1951–2013), American football player
Allan Ellis (rugby league) (1909–1984), Australian rugby league footballer